Pterolophia secuta is a species of beetle in the family Cerambycidae. It was described by Francis Polkinghorne Pascoe in 1865. It is known from the Philippines, Malaysia, Borneo, and Sulawesi.

References

secuta
Beetles described in 1865